Graham Kendrick (born 2 August 1950) is an English Christian singer, songwriter and worship leader. 

He is the son of Baptist pastor M. D. Kendrick and grew up in Laindon, Essex, and Putney. He now lives in Tunbridge Wells and is a member of Christ Church, Tunbridge Wells. He was a member of Ichthus Christian Fellowship. Together with Roger Forster, Gerald Coates and Lynn Green, he was a founder of March for Jesus.
Kendrick is founder of the British Organist Association march for Jesus and promotes traditional organist values across the UK ( organist review nov 2011)

Career
Kendrick began his songwriting career in the late 1960s. His most successful accomplishment is his authorship of the lyrics and music for the song, "Shine, Jesus, Shine", which is among the most widely heard songs in contemporary Christian worship worldwide.  His other songs have been primarily used by worshippers in Britain. Kendrick is a co-founder of the March for Jesus. He received a Dove Award in 1995 for his international work. In 2000, London School of Theology and Brunel University awarded Kendrick an honorary doctorate in Divinity ('DD') in "recognition of his contribution to the worship life of the Church".
He was awarded another DD in May 2008, from Wycliffe College in Toronto, Canada.

Although now best known as a worship leader and writer of worship songs, Kendrick began his career as a member of the Christian beat group Whispers of Truth (formerly the "Forerunners"). Later, he began working as a solo concert performer and recording artist in the singer/songwriter tradition.  He was closely associated with the organisation Musical Gospel Outreach and recorded several albums for their record labels.  On the first, Footsteps on the Sea, released in 1972, he worked with the virtuoso guitarist Gordon Giltrap.

Kendrick worked for a time as a member of "In the Name of Jesus", a mission team led by Clive Calver. He was based at St Michael le Belfrey, York in the late 1970s and was involved in student and university ministry with British Youth for Christ. At this time he recorded the albums Triumph in the Air and Cresta Run. Calver went on to run British Youth for Christ and the Evangelical Alliance, and then left the United Kingdom for the Evangelical Church in the United States. Kendrick, however, remained firmly fixed in the UK church as probably the most influential Christian songwriter of his generation.

Kendrick also released "Let the Flame Burn Brighter" as a single in 1989, which reached 55 in the UK Singles Chart.

He is a member of Compassionart, a charity founded by Martin Smith from Delirious?.

In more recent years Kendrick has developed the concept of "Psalm Surfing".

In May 2020 he took part in The UK Blessing, a worship song video collaboration of 65 churches released during the national coronavirus lockdown.

Popularity

"Shine, Jesus, Shine" is regularly highly placed in hymn popularity polls. Fellow songwriter and former Kendrick bandmember Stuart Townend has said, "I have no doubt that in 100 years time the name of Kendrick will be alongside Watts and Wesley in the list of the UK's greatest hymnwriters". Kendrick also has his critics, among them the journalist Quentin Letts, who has described him as "king of the happy-clappy banalities".

Discography

Albums
 Footsteps on the Sea (Key Records) 1972
 Bright Side Up (Key Records) 1973
 Paid on the Nail (with Peter Roe) (Key Records) 1974
 Breaking of the Dawn (Dovetail) 1976
 Fighter (Dovetail) 1978
 Jesus Stand Among Us (Dovetail) 1979
 Triumph in the Air (Glenmore Music) 1980
 18 Classics (Kingsway) 1981
 Cresta Run (Kingsway) 1981
 The King Is Among Us (Kingsway) 1981
 Nightwatch (Kingsway) 1983 - cassette only release
 The Blame (Kingsway) 1983
 Let God Arise (Kingsway) 1984
 Magnificent Warrior (Kingsway) 1985
 Make Way for the King of Kings: A Carnival of Praise (Kingsway) 1986
 Lamb of God (Integrity's Hosanna! Music) 1988 (British version of a 1987 album by Jim Gilbert)
 Make Way for Jesus: Shine Jesus Shine (Make Way Music) 1988
 Make Way for Christmas: The Gift (Make Way Music) 1988
 Make Way for the Cross: Let the Flame Burn Brighter (Make Way Music) 1989
 We Believe (Star Song) 1989
 Amazing Love (Integrity's Hosanna! Music) 1990
 Crown Him (Integrity's Hosanna! Music) 1991
 King of the Nations (Word UK) 1992
 Crown Him: The Worship Musical (Word UK) 1992
 Spark to a Flame (Megaphone/Word UK) 1993
 Rumours of Angels (Megaphone/Alliance) 1994
 Is Anyone Thirsty? (Megaphone/Alliance) 1995
 Illuminations (Megaphone/Alliance) 1996
 No More Walls (Make Way Music/Alliance) 1997
 The Millennium Chorus (Millennium Chorus Ltd) 2000
 What Grace (Make Way Music/Furious!) 2001
 Do Something Beautiful (Make Way Music/Furious!) 2003
 Sacred Journey (Make Way Music/Furious!) 2004
 USA Live Worship (Make Way Music) 2005
 Out of the Ordinary (Make Way Music/Furious!) 2006
 Dreaming of a Holy Night (Make Way Music/Furious!) 2007
 The Acoustic Gospels (Make Way Music) 2010
 Banquet (Make Way Music) 2011
 Worship Duets (Make Way Music) 2013
 Keep the Banner Flying High (Make Way Music) 2018

Singles
 "Let the Flame Burn Brighter" (single) (Make Way Music) 1989

EP
 No Scenes of Stately Majesty (E.P; Megaphone/Alliance) 1998
 Where It Began (Make Way Music) 2022

Collections
 The Easter Collection (Make Way Music/World Wide Worship) 2001
 Rumours of Angels / The Gift Double CD (Make Way Music/Furious!) 2001
 The Prayer Song Collection (Make Way Music/World Wide Worship) 2002
 The Psalm Collection (Make Way Music/World Wide Worship) 2002

Bibliography

 Graham Kendrick Worship (Eastbourne: Kingsway, 1984)
 Graham Kendrick (Ed) Ten Worshipping Churches (London: Marc Europe, 1987)
 Graham Kendrick, Gerald Coates, Roger Forster and Lynn Green with Catherine Butcher, March for Jesus (Eastbourne: Kingsway, 1992)
 Graham Kendrick Public Praise (Altamonte Springs: Creation House, 1992)
 Graham Kendrick, Clive Price Behind the Songs'' (Stowmarket: Kevin Mayhew Ltd, 2001)

References

External links
 
 Discography 1
 Discography 2
 

1950 births
Living people
British performers of Christian music
People from West Northamptonshire District
Christian hymnwriters
English hymnwriters
Evangelical Anglicans
Alumni of the University of Greenwich
English evangelicals
British New Church Movement
Musicians from Royal Tunbridge Wells
People from Royal Tunbridge Wells
Musicians from Kent